James Island is an island of the Andaman Islands. It belongs to the South Andaman administrative district, part of the Indian union territory of Andaman and Nicobar Islands.

Geography
The island belongs to the Napier Bay Islands and lies north of Shoal Bay.

Administration
Politically, James Island, along neighboring Napier Bay Islands, are part of Ferrargunj Taluk.

References 

Islands of South Andaman district
Uninhabited islands of India
Islands of India
Islands of the Bay of Bengal